Katleho Leokaoke (born 12 January 1996) is a South African cricketer. He was included in the North West squad for the 2016 Africa T20 Cup. In September 2018, he was named in North West's squad for the 2018 Africa T20 Cup. In September 2019, he was named in North West's squad for the 2019–20 CSA Provincial T20 Cup.

References

External links
 

1996 births
Living people
South African cricketers
North West cricketers
People from Klerksdorp